The Journal-Express was a weekly newspaper in Knoxville, Iowa. Founded in 1855, its publication was discontinued in May 2020, when it was merged with the Oskaloosa Herald as part of a series of cutbacks by owner CNHI, LLC that resulted from business losses caused by the COVID-19 pandemic.

It was published on Friday, and had a circulation of 2,034 two years before it was discontinued as a separate title.

The Knoxville Journal was founded in 1855 by William Milo Stone, later a Civil War hero and Iowa governor. In those years, the paper expressed the growing sentiments of a newly minted Republican party. The Express was built out of the old Marion County Democrat paper, founded in 1865.

Previous names
The following newspaper names preceded the current paper:
 The Knoxville Express (Knoxville, Iowa) 1884-1986
 Knoxville journal (Knoxville, Iowa) 1874-1986 
 The Bussey Record (Bussey, Iowa) 1950-1951
 Iowa voter (Knoxville, Iowa) 1867-1874
 Marion County express (Knoxville, Iowa) 1879-1884
 Knoxville journal (Knoxville [Iowa]) 1855-185?
 Knoxville Weekly Journal (Knoxville, Marion County, Iowa) 185?-1860
 Marion County Republican (Knoxville, Marion County, Iowa) 1860-1867
 Iowa voter (Knoxville, Iowa) 1867-1874

References

Newspapers published in Iowa
Knoxville, Iowa